The men's 400 metres at the 2011 World Championships in Athletics was held at the Daegu Stadium on August 28, 29 and 30.

Going into the Championships, defending champion LaShawn Merritt was serving a 2-year ban.  The ban was still in effect during the USA Outdoor Track and Field Championships, so Merritt was unable to compete.  Ordinarily, since 1997, the defending champion is automatically invited to the championships, but the United States stipulates that the champion must compete in the national championships.  It took a special decision by USATF to allow Merritt to enter.  Merritt had minimal racing opportunities prior to the championships.

In qualifying, ordinarily athletes try to use the minimum effort to advance to the next round, but Merritt ran the year's world leading time of 44.35 in heat 3.  The media focused on double amputee Oscar Pistorius, who ran 45.39 to qualify into the semi-finals.

In the semi finals, Merritt ran a more controlled and relaxed 44.76 in semi 1, while Jermaine Gonzales controlled semi 3 in 44.99 and 18-year-old Kirani James ran an easy 45.20 to take semi 2. Rondell Bartholomew also qualified, placing two athletes from tiny Grenada in the final.  Also twins Kévin and Jonathan Borlée placed two athletes from Belgium in the final.  While his time from the trials would have made the final, Pistorius ran 46.19 in his semi and did not advance. Kirani James won the final beating LaShawn Merritt on the line with a time of 44.60. At 18 years, 363 days old, James became the youngest ever world medallist for the men's 400 m.

Medalists

Records
Prior to the competition, the established records were as follows.

Qualification standards

Schedule

Results

Heats
Qualification: First 4 in each heat (Q) and the next 4 fastest (q) advance to the semifinals.

Semifinals
Qualification: First 2 in each heat (Q) and the next 2 fastest (q) advance to the final.

Final

References

External links
400 metres results at IAAF website

400
400 metres at the World Athletics Championships